The fourth season of Demark har talent aired on TV2 on 20 January 2018 and finished on 14 April 2018. The series will be again host by Christopher Læssø and Felix Schmidt. On the judging panel Jarl Friis-Mikkelsen, Cecilie Lassen, and Peter Frödin will return while new forth judge Thomas Buttenschøn while Nabiha won't return for her third season. once again in this season the golden buzzer is available for each judge to press and the hosts once the whole season to put one act straight through to the live shows. Moonlight Brotheres Won the competition against Anastasia Skukhtorova Who came second and Dance Group Champions League Family came third.

Semi-finals
The semi finals began on 10 March 2018. 7 acts will perform every week. 1 act will advanced from the public vote 1 act will advanced from the judges vote

Semi-final summary

Semi Finals 1

Semi Finals 2

  Due to the majority vote for Noa, Thomas’s vote was not required but he would have voted for Spahi Dance Studio.

Semi Finals 3

Semi Finals 4

Semi Finals 5

Final

Final summary

References

2018 Danish television seasons
Got Talent